Percy Bacon Brothers was a firm which produced stained glass in London from about 1880 until the late 1930s.  The firm was established by the painter and sculptor, Percy Charles Bacon (1860–1935). In about 1892 he was then joined in the business by his twin brother, Charles Percy Bacon, and another brother.  Their stained glass windows are found in the UK and across the world, including Australia, Canada, and the US.

History
Percy Charles and Charles Percy Bacon were born in Ipswich UK, in 1860.  By 1881 Percy Charles had established a firm in Charlotte Street, London. Between 1892 and 1931 the business was at 11 Newman Street, when it moved to 4 Endsleigh Gardens.  Among the artists employed by the firm were George Fellowes Prynne and his brother Edward Arthur Fellowes Prynne.   The business continued in operation until shortly before World War II when its plant was put to wartime service.

Windows
The windows of Percy Bacon Brothers were inspired by those of the 15th century, with the central figures generally framed by architectonic canopies of Late Gothic or Early Northern Renaissance form.  The windows are opulent in style, generally depicting Biblical figures and historical figures of the Church richly attired in heavy robes, often decorated at the borders with pearls.   The lower section of the window often contains a scroll bearing the relevant inscription, and supported by two angels.  Because their period of operation spanned the First World War, the firm was called upon to produce a great many memorial windows.  These often depict heroic subjects, the Archangel Michael and St George often occurring in their works immediately following the war.

Among the characteristics of the glass of this firm is that the flesh is of translucent off-white glass that may be fawn or greenish in hue and relies on very detailed painting and stippled shading to achieve effect. The hair is often stained yellow with silver nitrate.  The canopies are rarely coloured glass, but employ linear painting and shading, and have elements picked out with silver stain. The robes employ intensely coloured glass, often flashed, and sometimes etched to achieve elaborate patterns. There are often borders on the robes that are elaborately painted to resemble pearls and facetted jewels. The drawing of the figures displays a typical Late 19th-century academic approach.

Examples

 St James' Church, Sydney, large Georgian windows, each with a single saint, without canopies and set against plain quarries, to suit the style of the church.
 Chapel of the Cross (Chapel Hill, North Carolina) 1925, Above the altar, triple East window of the Crucifixion with red-winged seraphim, St Mary and St John flanked on the left by St Peter preaching ("God is no respecter of persons") and on the right St Paul preaching (the altar "to the unknown god"). Large traceried West window of the Incarnation including Nativity, shepherds, kings, and surmounted above lights of the Law (Moses) and the (four Major) Prophets. Windows fully exhibit characteristics described in the text above, including rich canopy work and jewelled robes.

See also
 British and Irish stained glass (1811–1918)

References

British stained glass artists and manufacturers